Events from the year 1694 in England.

Incumbents
 Monarch – William III, jointly with Mary II (until 28 December), then as sole monarch (starting 28 December)
 Parliament – 2nd of William and Mary

Events
 1 March – the HMS Sussex treasure fleet of thirteen ships is wrecked in the Mediterranean off Gibraltar with the loss of approximately 1,200 lives.
 May – the First Whig Junto is appointed to government.
 June – Henry Every leads a bloodless mutiny aboard the Charles II.
 27 July – the Bank of England is established by Royal charter following a proposal by William Paterson; John Houblon becomes its first Governor.
 5 September – Great Fire of Warwick.
 25 October – Queen Mary II founds the Royal Hospital for Seamen at Greenwich.
 3 December – Parliament passes the Meeting of Parliament Act (Triennial Act) requiring general elections every three years and an annual meeting.
 28 December – with the death of Queen Mary II (aged 32) from smallpox at Kensington Palace, King William III becomes sole monarch.
 Notorious voyage of the English slave ship Hannibal in the Atlantic slave trade out of Benin, ending with the death of nearly half of the 692 slaves aboard.

Publications
 Mary Astell's (anonymous) argument for the promotion of female education A Serious Proposal to the Ladies, for the Advancement of Their True and Greatest Interest.
 "N.H."'s The Ladies Dictionary, being a general entertainment of the fair-sex: a work never attempted before in English is published by John Dunton.

Births
 25 April – Richard Boyle, 3rd Earl of Burlington, architect (died 1753)
 22 September – Philip Dormer Stanhope, 4th Earl of Chesterfield, statesman and man of letters (died 1773)
 25 September – Henry Pelham, Prime Minister of Great Britain (died 1754)

Deaths
 2 January – Henry Booth, 1st Earl of Warrington, politician (born 1651)
 7 January – Charles Gerard, 1st Earl of Macclesfield (born c. 1618)
 17 June – Philip Howard, Roman Catholic Cardinal (born 1629)
 22 November – John Tillotson, Archbishop of Canterbury (born 1630)
 28 December – Queen Mary II of England, Scotland and Ireland (born 1662)

References

 
Years of the 17th century in England